Elphinstone Tower may refer to:
 Elphinstone Tower, Falkirk, a ruined tower house on the Dunmore Estate in central Scotland
 Elphinstone Tower (East Lothian)
 Elphinstone Tower, a tower of Stirling Castle

See also
 Elphinstone Place, a proposed tower block in Glasgow, cancelled in July 2008